Charbatia Air Base  is located approximately 12 km north of Cuttack, Odisha in eastern India. It is an aerial reconnaissance post of the intelligence agency's aviation unit, the Aviation Research Centre (ARC). The Research and Analysis Wing, India's primary foreign intelligence agency, operates intelligence collection aircraft through the ARC. The aircraft are fitted with electronic surveillance equipment and long range cameras capable of taking pictures of targets from high altitudes.

The airstrip was built by the British during the World War II and was abandoned post war. The base was later built with the assistance of the Central Intelligence Agency in the early 1960s and developed through till 1990s, was used for aerial surveillance and intelligence gathering of Pakistan and  China's strategic forces. The first aircraft was delivered in the mid 60s and was a World War II vintage C-46 which was outfitted with an oxygen distribution system for operator and flight personnel along with surveillance electronics and recording equipment at the Air America base in Tainan, Taiwan. The installation was supervised by the design engineer, Mr. Kent Williamson. Mr. Williamson, along with other experienced personnel also deployed to Charbatia to train the first operator and maintenance personnel. Later additions to the surveillance equipment include specially outfitted Boeing 727 and Gulfstream III jets.

In 2011, the Government of India which controls the airbase announced that it will be converted into a full-fledged Indian Air Force station with six C-130J Super Hercules transport aircraft. But the plans for setting up such a station was subsequently cancelled and the C-130 Hercules transport unit was shifted to Panagarh in West Bengal.

References

Transport in Cuttack
Indian Air Force bases
Airports in Odisha
Research and Analysis Wing
Aerial reconnaissance
1940s establishments in Orissa
Military airbases established in the 1940s
Airports with year of establishment missing
20th-century architecture in India